Transmembrane 4 L6 family member 5 is a protein that in humans is encoded by the TM4SF5 gene.

The protein encoded by this gene is a member of the transmembrane 4 superfamily, also known as the tetraspanin family. Most of these members are cell-surface proteins that are characterized by the presence of four hydrophobic domains. The proteins mediate signal transduction events that play a role in the regulation of cell development, activation, growth and motility. This encoded protein is a cell surface glycoprotein and is highly similar in sequence and structure to transmembrane 4 superfamily member 1. It may play a role in cell proliferation, and overexpression of this protein may be associated with the uncontrolled growth of tumour cells.

References

Further reading